The 1st Armoured Division was an armoured division of the British Army. It was formed as the Mobile Division on 24 November 1937, after several years of debate on the creation of such a formation. It was then renamed, in April 1939, the 1st Armoured Division. Following the start of the Second World War, in September 1939, subordinate units and formations were withdrawn from the division to reinforce others. Then, in May 1940, the division was deployed to France and then fought in the Battle of France. After several engagements and heavy tank losses, it was forced to withdraw to the UK, in June, during Operation Aerial. In late 1941, the division was sent to North Africa where it took part in the Western Desert campaign, notably fighting at the Battle of Gazala, and the First and the Second Battles of El Alamein. During 1942, Major-General Herbert Lumsden was wounded in action twice while leading the division and Major-General Alexander Gatehouse was wounded once.

The division then fought in the Tunisian campaign until the Axis defeat in North Africa in May 1943. It was during this period that it was temporarily renamed the 1st British Armoured Division, to avoid it being confused with the American 1st Armored Division. With the conclusion of fighting in Tunisia, the division remained in North Africa until 1944. In May, it started to move to Italy to fight in the Italian campaign. Between late August and the end of September, the division fought in several engagements as part of the Allied assault on the German Gothic Line. Due to a manpower shortage in the British Army, the division was broken up to provide reinforcements for other formations to keep them at full strength. In October 1944, the division relinquished command of its final troops and ceased to be an operational formation and was disbanded on 11 January 1945. In 1946, the 6th Armoured Division was renamed the 1st Armoured Division. It undertook occupational duties in Italy, before it was transferred to Palestine and disbanded in 1947.

Background and formation

During the interwar period, the British Army examined the lessons it learnt during the First World War and determined there was a need to experiment with and develop theories of manoeuvre and armoured warfare. The short-lived Experimental Mechanized Force was created and the army moved towards mechanisation to improve its battlefield mobility. During the early 1930s, General Archibald Montgomery-Massingberd, the Chief of the Imperial General Staff (CIGS), advocated for the formation of a tank-based force, dubbed a Mobile Division, that would be used to screen the advance of the British Expeditionary Force (BEF), as had the Cavalry Division in 1914. In early 1937, British planners assumed a European war would be fought against Germany, and a BEF would be dispatched to Europe to supplement Franco-Belgian forces. The BEF was to consist of one mobile and four infantry divisions. The former would ideally be dispatched seven days into such a war and around one week ahead of the infantry. By the end of the year, the timetable had been updated to the entire force being ready to embark 21 days into a war.

During 1937, the army was split on how to implement an armoured formation. General John Burnett-Stuart argued for a formation of cavalry regiments, equipped with light tanks, to be used in a screening role. Colonel Percy Hobart, deputy director for staff studies, favoured a more-balanced force that would include light tanks, more-heavily armoured-and-armed tanks, mechanised infantry, and supporting arms. B. H. Liddell Hart, a military theorist, supported this idea and influenced Leslie Hore-Belisha, the Secretary of State for War, on the subject. The division announced in November was based on Hobart's idea. The Mobile Division was formed with six light-tank regiments that were split between the 1st Light and the 2nd Light Armoured Brigades; three regiments of medium tanks that formed the Tank Brigade; two motorised infantry battalions, and two artillery regiments. It was intended for the formation to be 620-armoured-vehicles strong, but it had only around one-eighth of these vehicles on formation. The lack of armoured vehicles resulted in trucks being used for training in lieu of tanks. David French, a historian who wrote about the development of the British Army during this period, commented that cavalry officers largely supported mechanisation, but resisted turning their regiments into motorised infantry. They argued that light tanks better-replaced horses and allowed the regiments to continue their traditional reconnaissance role. French stated that this had a detrimental effect on the Mobile Division, which became 'tank heavy' with too few supporting infantry and the light-tank regiments exclusively committed to reconnaissance. A rhinoceros, being the most-heavily-armoured animal, was chosen as the divisional insignia. The design included white standing rhinoceros on a black oval.

There was a dispute over command following the creation of the division. General Cyril Deverell, now CIGS, favoured Major-General John Blakiston-Huston, who was a cavalry officer. Deverell believed Blakiston-Houston an appropriate choice, considering most of the forces assigned to the division came from cavalry regiments. Hore-Belisha and senior army officers opposed this; Liddell Hart argued for an officer from the Royal Tank Corps such as Hobart, Frederick Alfred Pile, or Charles Broad, on the basis experience with tanks and armoured warfare was needed. In a compromise, Major-General Alan Brooke, who had served in the artillery but had no prior experience in mobile forces or their training, was appointed to command on 24 November 1937.

Thereafter, the army established three types of divisions and solidified the role of the mobile division. Infantry divisions would penetrate the enemy's defensive line with the support of infantry tanks. Mobile divisions would then exploit any gaps created and the territory captured would be secured by fast-moving motor divisions (motorised infantry). It was envisioned this would transform the attack into a breakthrough and maintain mobility. Burnett-Stuart, who had been responsible for the training of the Mobile Division, influenced its doctrine. He argued the assigned infantry was not "to be put on to a position by tanks and told to hold it, and they are not meant to fight side by side with your tanks in the forefront"; the infantry's role was simply to protect the tanks when they were stationary. Burnett-Stuart's tactics did not conform with British doctrine, which promoted combined-arms co-operation to win battles, as did German armoured warfare doctrine that believed tanks alone would not be a decisive weapon. Burnett-Stuart's thinking, however, predominated within the British armoured forces until a doctrine reformation occurred in 1942.

On 15 July 1938, Major-General Roger Evans, a cavalry officer, took command of the division following the promotion of Brooke. By this point, the Vickers Medium Mark II, which was the main weapon system of the tank brigade, was considered obsolete. Starting in December, the first deliveries of modern cruiser tanks arrived to replace them. In April 1939, the division was renamed the 1st Armoured Division. The following month, the army developed a new organisation for such formations; they were intended to have one light-armoured brigade with 108 light tanks and 66 light cruisers, and one heavy-armoured brigade outfitted with 78 light cruisers, 45 heavy cruisers, and 24 tanks equipped to provide close support. Additionally, 13 heavy cruisers and 15 light cruisers were to be spread around the divisional and brigade headquarters. This would give such a division a total of 349 tanks. The division's support group was to have one artillery regiment, one anti-aircraft/anti-tank regiment, engineers, and two infantry battalions.

In January 1939, Hore-Belisha proposed splitting the Mobile Division into two smaller formations but found no support. The issue was again broached a month later, and was accepted in principle by the Cabinet. Shortly after, the French government was informed of a preliminary timetable for the arrival of the BEF in the event of war; "One Regular Armoured Division will become available about the middle of 1940".

Second World War

Home service and Battle of France

At the outbreak of the Second World War on 3 September 1939, the division consisted of the 1st Light, the 1st Heavy (formally the Tank Brigade) and the 2nd Light Armoured Brigades. During October that year, the support group's two regiments of artillery were withdrawn and dispatched to France to join the BEF. The following month, the 1st Light Brigade was removed and used to form the 2nd Armoured Division over the following months. This re-organisation left the division with 190 light and 25 cruiser tanks. During the same period, the Commander-in-Chief, Home Forces, General Walter Kirke developed Julius Caesar, a plan to defend the UK from a potential German invasion. In this plan, the 1st Armoured Division was to be within a short distance of the East Anglian coast, which was assumed to be the country's most vulnerable point. The 2nd Light Brigade and the support group were located in west Suffolk and north-west Essex while the heavy brigade was based further inland in Hertfordshire. A small number of tanks and an infantry company were maintained as a separate unit to counter any small Fallschirmjäger (German paratrooper) landings. During January 1940, with the risk of a landing reduced due to winter, the division concentrated for training in Dorset. On 14 April, the 2nd Light Armoured Brigade was re-named the 2nd Armoured Brigade and the 1st Heavy Brigade became the 3rd Armoured Brigade. Later in the month, the infantry of the support group were transferred to the 30th Infantry Brigade. By 3 May 1940, the division had 203 light and 121 cruiser tanks and it was hoped it would be able to cross the English Channel to France and finalise its training at Pacy-sur-Eure, Normandy.

On 10 May 1940, the Phoney War—the period of inactivity on the Western Front since the start of the conflict—ended as the Germans invaded Belgium and the Netherlands. As the Allied forces advanced to meet the German invasion, the main German attack came via the Ardennes Forest and continued into France. This invasion split the Allied forces in Belgium from the rest of the French Army along the Franco-German border. The 1st Armoured Division, now 114 light and 143 cruiser tanks strong, was still in Dorset and was ordered to France. The division lacked spare parts and bridging equipment, did not have all of its wireless equipment, lacked a full complement of anti-tank or anti-aircraft guns, and had no tank reserves to replace losses. An advance party landed at Le Havre on May 15 and moved to Arras. Approaching German forces, coupled with aerial attacks on Le Havre and the mining of the port resulted in the decision to unload the rest of the division at Cherbourg. On 19 May, the first meaningful elements landed. On 22 May, the 3rd Armoured Brigade had one of its regiments removed and transferred to the 30th Infantry Brigade.

The division was ordered to seize and hold bridges across the Somme between Picquigny and Pont-Remy, and was then to support the BEF as circumstances dictated. The leading elements of the division arrived near Rouen on 22 May. The following day, still not fully concentrated, Evans and his staff were aware up to six panzer divisions (armoured divisions) were on the east side of the Somme, although they were believed to have been greatly weakened by the fighting of their advance. They also held the impression that the Battle of Arras, which had occurred two days earlier and had already concluded, had sparked a general Anglo-French counterattack. In actuality, ten German divisions were operating in this area, were not as weakened as British command believed, had already seized and reinforced bridgeheads across the Somme, and had completed the encirclement of the BEF. Conflicting orders were issued; the BEF ordered the division to advance on the Somme with haste and with whatever units were available, then continue to Saint-Pol to "cut the rear of the enemy who are about St Omer and relieve the threat to the right of the BEF". Général Alphonse Joseph Georges, commander of all French forces operating in the north-east of the country, ordered the 1st Armoured Division to move towards Abbeville and clear the area of German forces, which were implied to be in small numbers. After completing this task, they were to move towards the BEF and provide it with flanking cover. The French Seventh Army gave a third set of instructions, which stated the division was under their command and was to provide that army with flanking protection for an attack on Amiens. Evans held the opinion that his force was unable to achieve any of these missions due to the lack of infantry and supporting arms and that his division had still not assembled.

The first elements of the 2nd Armoured Brigade reached the Somme around 01:00 on 24 May. Two tanks were lost due to anti-tank mines, and the brigade found the bridges to be well-guarded. A few hours later, the brigade was reinforced with the 4th Battalion, Border Regiment, and a second attempt was made against three crossings. Numerous tanks and men were lost attempting to reach two, with the attacks repulsed. At Ailly-sur-Somme, near Amiens, men from the 4th Borderers secured a bridgehead. The bridge was destroyed, the attack called off, and the Borderers withdrawn. By the end of the day, the division was ordered to hold its positions. On 26 May, after receiving orders from London to come under French command and the division having finally completed its landing in France, Evans was ordered to split his force. The 2nd Armoured Brigade moved to Biencourt to support the French 2nd Light Cavalry Division, while the 3rd Armoured Brigade went to Buigny to supplement the French 5th Light Cavalry Division. The following day, this force began the Battle of Abbeville on dug-in German positions guarding several bridgeheads. Tank attacks, without infantry or other supporting arms, resulted in the division losing 65 tanks. Fifty-five more suffered mechanical breakdowns, due to the lack of maintenance since landing.

Over the following days, the Dunkirk evacuation rescued the BEF. The 1st Armoured Division and the remaining British forces in France, assisted the French with holding a defensive line along the Somme; the French now appreciating the division could not force a bridge crossing due to the way it was organised and equipped. On 5 June, elements of the division assisted the 51st (Highland) Infantry Division near Oisemont and lost several tanks. The next day, the division repelled further German attacks and 44 took prisoners. It then came under the command of the French Tenth Army and the remnants of the division started to concentrate, with the instruction to launch a counterattack into the southern flank of the renewed German advance. No significant attack occurred, and the division withdrew beyond the Seine on 8 June. In the final stages of the campaign, Britain attempted to reinforce France with a second BEF while the French considered a national redoubt in Brittany that would include the division. Shortly afterwards, the proposal was rejected, all British forces were ordered to withdraw from France and the 1st Armoured Division was directed to Cherbourg. The 2nd Armoured Brigade's tanks were put aboard trains but never arrived. The 3rd Armoured Brigade's remaining 26 tanks moved by road. Between 16 and 18 June, now under the command of Lieutenant-General James Marshall-Cornwall's Norman Force, the division was withdrawn from Brest, Cherbourg, and Saint-Nazaire in Operation Aerial, and returned to the UK with just 13 tanks.

The Division was then placed in reserve in Surrey to undertake anti-invasion duties and was given priority for tank production, over the 2nd Armoured Division, so it could rebuild. By October, the tank-strength of the division had increased to 18 light and 133 cruiser tanks. The same month, the 3rd Armoured Brigade was replaced by the 22nd Armoured Brigade. In April 1941, tanks were withdrawn and transported to reinforce British forces in Egypt via the Tiger convoy. In June, with a stalemate in the Western Desert campaign that was being fought in Egypt and Italian Libya, General Sir Claude Auchinleck—commanding British forces in North Africa and the Middle East—informed the War Office that he needed at least two and ideally three armoured divisions to undertake offensive action to lift the Siege of Tobruk. The division then lost more tanks, as they were withdrawn and shipped to Egypt. This was followed by the 22nd Armoured Brigade being detached and dispatched as well. The division, equipped with 60 M3 Stuart light and 124 Crusader tanks, left the UK in August aboard convoy WS 12.

Initial desert fighting
When the division arrived in Egypt in mid-November 1941, the latest British offensive Operation Crusader had already started. Major-General Herbert Lumsden now held command and his force was ordered to undertake desert training. By the end of that year's December, Operation Crusader had concluded with an Axis withdrawal to western Libya. The 1st Armoured Division moved into eastern Libya, took over the front line and was reinforced with the 200th Guards Brigade. Apart from small infantry forces, the division was the only force within  of the front line. The 1st Armoured Division was further reinforced with additional infantry and artillery units, although these had never before trained with the formation. Divisional-level training was intended to continue but inadequate fuel stocks interrupted it. In early January 1942, the division was subjected to an aerial attack that wounded Lumsden, who was replaced by Major-General Frank Messervy. On 21 January 1942, Axis forces attacked the 150-tank strong division and forced it to conduct a fighting withdrawal. It, along with the rest of the Eighth Army, retreated until the army regrouped at Gazala in February. During this period, 42 tanks were lost in combat and a further 30 were damaged or abandoned.

Lumsden resumed command on 12 February 1942, and the 22nd Armoured Brigade rejoined in April. According to Michael Carver (a participant of the battle, who would later become a field marshal and then a historian), Lumsden resented Messervy for the setback that had befallen the division in January. Messervy's 7th Armoured Division, with one armoured brigade, was considered to be as strong as the 1st due to both formations having an equal number of M3 Grant medium tanks. According to Carver, these two factors made Lumsden reluctant to support the 7th if called upon and was adamant none of his force would be allocated to it.

On 26 May 1942, Axis forces struck the Allied positions and initiated the Battle of Gazala. The next morning, the division was ordered to send the 22nd Armoured Brigade to join the 7th Armoured Division after it was realised a major Axis attack was underway. According to Carver, there was an "acrimonious exchange" between Lumsden and XIII Corps headquarters, the parent formation of the 1st Armoured Division, and no order was issued for two hours. The 22nd Armoured Brigade was attacked by Axis armoured forces; it lost 30 tanks and withdrew northwards. In the afternoon of 27 May, the division counterattacked with its full force. It was later supported by the 1st Army Tank Brigade and together checked the Axis advance. Over the following days, the division engaged the German 15th Panzer Division and the Italian 132nd Armored Division "Ariete" with mixed success.

By 12 June, tank crew morale was low, and the relationship between Lumsden and Messervy further deteriorated. The brigadiers of the division's armoured brigades, which had temporarily been assigned to the 7th Armoured Division, requested to be returned to the 1st and this request further damaged Lumsden's relationship with Messervy. During the day, the tanks of the 7th Armoured Division were placed under the command of the 1st, and it was able to use 83 Grants, 59 Crusaders and 64 Stuarts. That day, the division battled the 15th and 21st Panzer Divisions. The Allies' initial success at halting a German tank attack was followed by an attack on the 4th Armoured Brigade, and by that evening, it had 15 of the 95 tanks with which it had started. The 1st Armoured Division had been reduced to 50 tanks. While tank losses had been heavy, most were able to be recovered and were sent to workshops to be repaired. On 13 June, the division's infantry—the 201st Guards Brigade (formerly the 200th Guards Brigade), holding an entrenched position called the Knightsbridge Box—came under a German assault. The armoured brigades fought additional actions in support of the infantry but during the hours of darkness it was decided to abandon the position, marking a turning point in the battle and the start of the Eighth Army's retreat from Gazala.

As the Eighth Army retreated into Egypt, it formed up at Mersa Matruh, which had originally been considered the location in which British forces would conduct "a last-ditch stand" because its loss would bring the Mediterranean Fleet based at Alexandria and the city of Cairo within range of Axis aerial attacks. By 1942, El Alamein, a  stretch of desert between the sea and impassable salt marshes to the south offered a stronger defensive position; however, it lay a further  to the east and Auchinleck had to factor-in the political, moral, and propaganda implications of abandoning Mersa Matruh without a fight. The 1st Armoured Division, reinforced with tanks from the 7th Armoured Division, was positioned in the desert to protect army's southern desert flank. On 27 June, the division fought the 15th Panzer and that evening, withdrew as part of a general retreat conducted by XIII Corps.

First El Alamein 

The division regrouped at El Alamein with the rest of the army and was assigned a counterattack role. On 1 July, the first German attack began. One of the division's brigades became bogged down in soft sand while another was not made aware of the fighting for two hours due to poor communications. When the division finally entered the battle, it engaged the 15th Panzer Division and forced it to withdraw. The next day, fighting resumed with an engagement against the 21st Panzer Division. At dusk on 3 July, the division fended off a determined German attack. Both sides were now spent. On 5 July, Lumsden quarrelled with his superior Lieutenant-General Willoughby Norrie. Lumsden wanted his division, which now contained the majority of the army’s armoured forces, to be relieved after weeks of continuous action.

A short period of inactivity, during which both sides entrenched themselves on the territory they held, followed. Ruweisat Ridge dominated the central part of the battlefield. The eastern end was under Allied control while axis forces occupied the western end. Operation Bacon was intended to occupy the entirety of the ridge via a night attack by Major-General Leslie Inglis’ 2nd New Zealand Division. The 1st Armoured Division was to provide support, but Inglis and Lumsden argued over the way the division would be used. Inglis wanted the tanks to move up and be able to defend the infantry at dawn and to fend off anticipated German counterattacks. Lumsden cited Auchinleck's instruction that the division was not to be fixed in an infantry-support role and was to be able to engage and destroy Axis armour as needed. On 13 July, a conference was held by XIII Corps, during which the two divisional commanders grudgingly reconciled and decided how the 1st Armoured Division would be used, although both left with different impressions of the subject. The New Zealanders still expected armoured support at first light, which would require the tanks to move forward during the night in preparation under the assumption of success. Written orders provided to the division called for it to provide flanking protection and exploit any success achieved by the infantry once codewords were received, which indicated the tanks would only move once success had been confirmed.

Two days later, the New Zealand infantry assaulted the ridge, but communication breakdowns meant they were unable to inform the 1st Armoured Division of their success and the tanks did not move. The lack of armoured support resulted in at least one New Zealand battalion being overrun during a German tank-based counterattack, causing a controversy that the division failed to carry out its orders to support the New Zealanders. At around 06:30, the first elements of the division began to move forward, and it took two hours to advance the few miles to the prior front line. Isolated pockets of entrenched Italians, whom the New Zealanders had bypassed during the night, were able to halt the advance. Despite efforts by the 5th Indian Infantry Brigade to clear these pockets to allow the 1st Armoured Division forward, minefields and flanking fire from additional Axis positions impeded progress, and the division was not in position to assist the New Zealanders when a large attack was unleashed upon them by German armour in the afternoon. Small groups of Italian and German tanks that moved towards the 1st Armoured Division were, however, repulsed. In conversations between Lumsden and New Zealand officers, Lumsden said he had verbally informed his brigadiers to move forward during the night, although no written evidence exists to support this. Lumsden had, by that point, become notorious for providing verbal instructions to his subordinates, denying them if a positive outcome was not achieved, and taking praise if successful. Historian Niall Barr wrote; "there was no understanding within 2nd New Zealand Division of the difficulties which tank crews faced in combat and seemingly no recognition within 1st Armoured Division of its responsibility to ensure that Eighth Army’s infantry did not face an armoured counterattack alone".

Operation Splendour, which called for the New Zealanders to seize the El Mreir depression with support from the 1st Armoured Division, followed. Planning for this operation coincided with Lumsden being wounded during an air attack and his replacement by Major-General Alexander Gatehouse who, due to undertaking prior duties, was absent from the planning sessions and was not informed of the situation when he arrived, leading to differing expectations of the division's role. In the early morning of 22 July, the New Zealanders reported the capture of their objectives and requested the 1st Armoured Division to move forward. The armoured brigades were ordered to be prepared to deal with German counterattacks but were not ordered to advance. Four hours later, as a repeat of 15 July played out for the infantry, the 1st Armoured Division spotted and engaged German tanks. Minor efforts to advance were thwarted by Axis anti-tank gunfire from positions believed to have been bypassed during the night assault and the tanks withdrew. During the day, Inglis fought with Gatehouse over the lack of armour intervention; Gatehouse said he had not been asked to provide support.

Operation Manhood, the final action of the battle, started on 26 July with the division supporting Australian, British and South African infantry. The infantry night attack succeeded while the division conducted a night march to be in position at daybreak to repel German counterattacks. Reports, however, indicated minefields had not been cleared so at dawn on 27 July, the tanks were again not in a position to support the exposed infantry, and one Australian battalion and one British brigade suffered heavy losses. In the mid-morning, tanks started to pass through the gaps in the minefield but German anti-tank guns had been relocated and halted the division’s efforts. Brigadier Frederick Kisch, the chief engineer of the Eighth Army, condemned the division for not doing more during this operation, stating gaps had been created but the division would not move until they were completely satisfied their tanks would not strike mines. According to Barr, this is set against a context of the division needing to conserve tanks and having run into mines in all previous actions. Barr wrote some of the gaps created during Manhood were completely clear, some were found to contain no live or dummy mines, and at least one had not been completely cleared. There was little coordination between the units clearing the minefields and with too few liaison officers, the division was not informed of the openings. Had they been aware, they could have been in position well in advance of the German attacks. The long-term outcome of this was for each formation to be given integrated engineer support for lifting mines, and the responsibility for lifting mines in the path of their advance without needing to rely on other units to do it for them.

Second El Alamein to Tunis

With the fighting over, the division moved into reserve for rest, leave, integrating reinforcements, and to conduct training that was to last until October and would include night marches. During this period, Major-General Raymond Briggs assumed command and the division was reorganised to conform with War Office directions that were issued in May 1942. It then composed of the 2nd Armoured Brigade (with 1 Grant, 92 Shermans, and 68 Crusaders) and the 7th Motor Brigade of three infantry battalions.

On 23 October 1942, the Second Battle of El Alamein began with Operation Lightfoot and a night march by the division. However, unable to extract from the minefields they had to force, the division spent the following days engaging Axis armour from within the minefields. Three days after the start of the battle, the division's infantry launched a night assault to capture two Axis strongholds, although map-reading errors delayed progress. The subsequent defence of Outpost Snipe inflicted heavy losses on Axis forces that conducted a counterattack and resulted in Lieutenant-Colonel Victor Buller Turner being awarded the Victoria Cross. 

On 2 November, Operation Supercharge, the next phase of the battle, commenced. The 9th Armoured Brigade, an independent formation, was tasked with charging an Axis anti-tank gun line near Tel el Aqqaqir, and to create enough damage to allow the 1st Armoured Division to follow and break through the Axis lines. Despite the loss of 70 out of 94 tanks and over 200 casualties, not enough damage was done to the Axis positions and the division was unable to advance. According to Barr, the division "would have met the same fate" as the 9th Armoured Brigade had they done so. The division battled with Axis armoured formations throughout the day, losing 54 tanks that were destroyed or damaged, and in return disabled or destroyed around 70. During the darkness of the following morning, the 7th Motor Brigade launched an unsuccessful attack to breach this same position; at least 26 tanks were lost during the day to further Axis tank engagements. In the final stages of the battle, the 90th Light Division was repeatedly engaged as they conducted a rearguard action to protect the Axis forces that had started their general retreat from El Alamein. Throughout the battle, map-reading errors caused repeated problems for the division and affected other formations fighting alongside them. With the battle over, the division took part in the westward pursuit of the retreating Axis forces. 

The division's next action was in March 1943, when it joined the Battle of the Mareth Line after having entered Tunisia following the conclusion of the pursuit. This was followed by an attack towards Wadi Akarit on 29 March and its embroilment in the Battle of Wadi Akarit one week later. During April, the division was assigned to the First Army, which had advanced from Algeria into Tunisia. It was then redesignated as the 1st British Armoured Division to avoid confusion with the American 1st Armored Division. At this time, the Allied tanks were painted green to replace their prior desert camouflage colours. The division then took part in Operation Vulcan from April 23, and fought at El Kourzia. Their final action of the campaign took place on 8 May near Tunis. With the conclusion of fighting in Tunisia, the division remained in North Africa until 1944.

Italian campaign

In May 1944, the 1st Armoured Division started to move to Italy to join the Italian campaign; it did not complete its landings until mid-June. It was then held in reserve, being composed of the divisional headquarters, divisional troops, and the 2nd Armoured Brigade. In July, the division was provided with two infantry brigades to finalise a new organisation that reflected the need for additional infantry in Italy. Troops continued to be added to the division until 23 August. The late arrival of troops and the switching of units with other formulations hindered the division's ability to train as cohesive force. On 14 August, Major-General Richard Hull took command.

The 1st Armoured Division was tasked with exploiting any success achieved by their infantry colleagues, who were assaulting the German Gothic Line. At the end of August 1944, it moved forward to join the fighting, advancing behind the assaulting infantry, and lost 22 tanks due to mechanical breakdowns by the time it reached the Foglia river on 3 September. The 46th Infantry Division had led the 1st Armoured Division through German defences. It had been expected to seize crossings over the Marano river but it had not been able to do so. Moving through the 46th’s position, the 1st Armoured Division advanced towards Coriano. The two leading armoured regiments, each with a supporting infantry company, were met with heavy anti-tank gunfire from the 29th Panzergrenadier Division. For several hours, they attempted to progress before withdrawing at dusk, having lost about 40 tanks. The division's overall tank strength fell from 141 to 86. A more-successful attack was made the following day when a village was captured and 60 prisoners were taken, but this advantage was unable to be exploited due to insufficient supporting infantry.

A renewed assault in the same vicinity took place on 12 September, when the division attacked the 26th Panzer and the 98th Infantry Divisions. The attack was a success; an important ridge was captured and 789 prisoners were taken. In conjunction with other formations, the division then cleared Coriano but immediate exploitation was made difficult due to German opposition and defences, and too few infantry were able to support the attack. Further advances were made on 15 and 16 September, when the division's infantry captured another village and two days later, a hill. The division's armoured brigade came under heavy attack on 20 September when operating near the village of Ceriano and trying to advance towards the Marecchia river. A small amount of terrain was gained but one regiment was reduced to 18 tanks. At the end of the day, the division's infantry moved to secure the ground captured and heavy rain ended the fighting. Between the end of August and 21 September, the division suffered 1,111 casualties. The division subsequently fought its way across the Marecchia between 22 and 23 September and then, in its final action, captured Santarcangelo di Romagna on 24 September.

Oliver Leese, the commanding officer of the Eighth Army, criticised the division's performance during the fighting, saying; "it is extraordinary how difficult it is to make new troops realise the inter-dependence of tanks and infantry until they have gained the knowledge by bitter experience in battle". William Jackson, the author of the British official history for this period, commented that the 6th Armoured Division would have been a better choice for the role the 1st undertook in Italy because it "was fully experienced in hill, if not mountain warfare and would have been a better choice than the ad hoc last minute grouping of three brigades which was all that 1st Armoured Division could really claim to be".

By mid-1944, the British Army was in the midst of a manpower crisis; it did not have enough men to replace the losses suffered by front line infantry units. In the Italian theatre, the army needed to find at least 21,000 reinforcements and had suffered an average of 300 casualties per day during the August-to-September fighting that compounded this issue. To address this crisis, the War Office started to transfer men from the Royal Artillery and the Royal Air Force to infantry training depots but this was not enough to stem the shortfall of available soldiers and the decision was made to disband divisions to move the men to combat formations. The 1st Armoured Division was chosen to be disbanded. The 43rd Gurkha Lorried Infantry Brigade, which had come under its command after moving to Italy, was transferred to the 56th (London) Infantry Division to replace the 168th (2nd London) Brigade|168th (London) Infantry Brigade that had been withdrawn due to lack of reinforcements. Divisional troops and the 18th Infantry Brigade (previously the 7th Motor Brigade) were reassigned to other formations to reinforce them, while the 2nd Armoured Brigade was retained as an independent armoured force. 

The divisional headquarters was also maintained. During October 1944, it commanded three small, ad hoc groups that had been created and was used to screen assembling Allied forces during further fighting on the Gothic Line. Around the same time, German intelligence determined the division had been all but disbanded. The headquarters relinquished command of its final troops on 28 October and the division ceased to be an operational formation. It was officially disbanded on 11 January 1945.

Post war
In July 1946, while located at Trieste, the 6th Armoured Division was redesignated as the 1st Armoured Division. It renamed formation maintained the 6th Armoured Division's insignia of a mailed fist. During 1947, the division transferred to Palestine where it was disbanded that September.

In 1978, 1st Division was retitled as the 1st Armoured Division. Five years later, it adopted an insignia that merged the designs of the 1st Divisions and the Second World War-era's 1st Armoured Division. The formation went on to fight in the Gulf War and in 2014 was retitled as the 1st (United Kingdom) Division.

See also

 List of commanders of the British 1st Armoured Division
 List of orders of battle for the British 1st Armoured Division
 British armoured formations of the Second World War
 Guy Lizard
 List of British divisions in World War II
 Structure of the British Army in 1939

Notes
 Footnotes

 Citations

References

Further reading

  (in three parts)

External links
  (Report outlines 1st Armoured Division's activities during October 1944, specifically "Elbo Force" and "Wheeler Force".)
  (An essay detailing the 1st Armoured Division in France, 1940)

Armoured divisions of the British Army in World War II
British armoured divisions
Military units and formations established in 1939
Military units and formations disestablished in 1945
1939 establishments in the United Kingdom
Military units and formations of the British Empire in World War II